Court Square Historic District may refer to:
Court Square–Dexter Avenue Historic District, listed on the NRHP in Alabama
Court Square Historic District (Leitchfield, Kentucky), National Register of Historic Places listings in Grayson County, Kentucky 
Court Square Historic District (Springfield, Massachusetts), listed on the NRHP in Massachusetts
Court Square Historic District (Memphis, Tennessee), National Register of Historic Places listings in Shelby County, Tennessee